Middleton is a town in the Metropolitan Borough of Rochdale, Greater Manchester, England, on the River Irk  southwest of Rochdale and  northeast of Manchester city centre. Middleton had a population of 42,972 at the 2011 Census. It lies on the northern edge of Manchester, with Blackley to the south and Moston to the south east.

Historically part of Lancashire, Middleton's name comes from it being the centre of several circumjacent settlements. It was an ecclesiastical parish of the hundred of Salford, ruled by aristocratic families. The Church of St Leonard is a Grade I listed building. The Flodden Window in the church's sanctuary is thought to be the oldest war memorial in the United Kingdom, memorialising the archers of Middleton who fought at the Battle of Flodden in 1513. In 1770, Middleton was a village of twenty houses, but in the 18th and 19th centuries it grew into a thriving and populous seat of textile manufacture and it was granted borough status in 1886.

Langley in the north of the town was one of Manchester City Council's overspill council estates, whilst Alkrington in the south is a suburban area.

History
In 616, Æthelfrith of Bernicia, an Anglo-Saxon King, crossed the Pennines with an army and passed through Manchester to defeat the Brythons in the Battle of Chester. A wave of Anglian colonists followed this military conquest and their settlements are identified by the "ton" Old English suffix to local place names. Royton, Crompton, Moston, Clayton, Ashton and Middleton are a number of settlements northeast of Manchester suggested to have been founded as part of this colonisation. It is therefore thought that Middleton as a settlement dates from the 7th century.

Although unmentioned in the Domesday Book of 1086, Middleton is said to be "of great antiquity"; a community at Middleton is thought to have evolved outwards from a church that existed considerably earlier than the Norman conquest of England.

The name Middleton first appears in 1194, and derives from the Old English middel-tūn, meaning middle farm or settlement, probably a reference to its central position between Rochdale and Manchester.

During the Middle Ages, Middleton was a centre of domestic flannel and woollen cloth production.

The development of Middleton as a centre of commerce occurred during the 17th and 18th centuries as a result of the effect of the Industrial Revolution. Additional to this, Lord Suffield obtained a Royal Charter from King George III in 1791 to hold a weekly market and three annual summer fairs in Middleton. Suffield built a market house, warehouses and shambles in the town at his own expense.

Industrial scale textile manufacture was introduced to Middleton as a result of the Industrial Revolution. Middleton became a centre for silk production in the 18th century, which developed into a cotton spinning industry by the mid-19th century and which continued through to the mid-20th century. This transition gave rise to Middleton as a mill town.

The town's local newspaper, the Middleton Guardian has a history going back to Victorian times. copies can be found in the local library of every publication since 1908.

JW Lees houses its brewery at Middleton Junction. The brewery owns several pubs in the Greater Manchester area.

The town was linked to the national rail network until 1964 when Middleton railway station closed. Mills Hill is now the nearest station.

Governance

Lying within the historic county boundaries of Lancashire from the early 12th century, Middleton was once an ecclesiastical parish of the hundred of Salford, and in Oldham poor law union.

In 1861 commissioners were established for the improvement of Middleton and Tonge townships or civil parishes. In 1878, the township of Alkrington and parts of the townships of Hopwood and Thornham were added to the area of the commissioners. It was in 1886 this territory was incorporated as a borough, giving it Borough status in the United Kingdom. Following the Local Government Act 1894 parts of Great Heaton and Little Heaton townships were added to the newly created Municipal Borough of Middleton, a local government district in the administrative county of Lancashire. In 1933 there were exchanges of territory between the borough of Middleton, the City of Manchester and Chadderton Urban District. In the same year, parts of Unsworth were amalgamated with Middleton, whilst part of it was moved to Royton Urban District. It was proposed in the Redcliffe-Maud Report that Middleton become part of a new Metropolitan Borough of Oldham, however, following the Local Government Act 1972, the Municipal Borough of Middleton was abolished and its territory became part of the Metropolitan Borough of Rochdale within the metropolitan county of Greater Manchester.

The Middleton parliamentary constituency was created by the Redistribution of Seats Act 1885. It was abolished in 1918 when Middleton became part of the Middleton and Prestwich constituency.

Today Middleton forms part of the Heywood and Middleton parliamentary constituency, represented in the House of Commons by Chris Clarkson, of the Conservative Party.

Geography

The town of Rochdale lies to the north-northeast. The town is supposed to have derived its name, Middle-town, from its situation midway between Manchester and Rochdale. It is situated on an ancient road between those places.

Middleton experiences a temperate maritime climate, like much of the British Isles, with relatively cool summers and mild winters. There is regular but generally light precipitation throughout the year. Middleton is watered by two confluent streams which have their rise in the immediate district.

Much of Middleton's built environment is characterised by its 19th-century red-brick terraced houses, the infrastructure that was built to support these and the town's former cotton mills, although from the middle of the 20th century the town saw the growth of its outlying residential areas of Langley, Hollin and Boarshaw which is predominately ex-local authority housing. The skyline is marked by St. Leonard's Church. The urban structure of Middleton is regular in comparison to most towns in England. Residential dwellings and streets are located around the town centre.

There is a mixture of high-density urban areas, suburbs, and semi-rural locations in Middleton, but overwhelmingly the land use in the town is urban. The territory of Middleton is contiguous with other urban areas on its southern and eastern sides, and for purposes of the Office for National Statistics, forms part of the Greater Manchester Urban Area, the United Kingdom's third largest conurbation. The M60 motorway passes to the south of Middleton; the M62 passes to the north. A heavy rail line enters Middleton from Moston and Chadderton to the south, and passes to the east of Middleton's town centre before continuing on northwards to Rochdale.

Varyingly agreed divisions and suburbs of Middleton include Alkrington, Bowlee, Boarshaw, Cheapside, Greengate, Hebers, Hollin, Hopwood, Jumbo, Langley, Moorclose, Rhodes, Stake Hill, Middleton Junction, Thornham and Tonge. Mills Hill is an area shared between Middleton and Chadderton.

Economy

Industrial polymer, thermoplastics and nonwovens producer The Vita Group have a registered office in Middleton. Kitbag operate a distribution centre from Greengate in Middleton.

Bluebird Bus and Coach is a travel company based in Middleton. Bus company JP Travel has been based in Middleton since 1974. Robert McBride, a household and personal care product manufacturers, is also based in the town.

Landmarks

Several of Middleton's buildings were designed by Edgar Wood, a local-born influential architect of his day. Several in Middleton are landmarks and are notable.

Middleton has recently benefited from redevelopments which have seen the construction of a new sports, leisure and civic centre, 'Middleton Arena'. A large new Tesco supermarket has also just been opened in the town centre.

In the early 1970s, The Arndale Property Trust cleared land adjacent to Middleton Gardens to build an 'American-style' modern shopping precinct. The Middleton Arndale Centre commenced trading in 1971, although it was officially opened by Her Royal Highness the Duchess of Kent in March 1972.

St. Leonard's Church

The Parish Church of St Leonard was completed in 1524, incorporating two stone arches made of stonework from an earlier Norman church. A wooden Saxon church is believed to have occupied the site long before the Norman church was built, in about 1100.

The present church was built by Sir Richard Assheton, in celebration of the knighthood granted to him by Henry VIII for his part in the Battle of Flodden, the largest battle ever fought between England and Scotland. The Flodden Window, in the sanctuary, is thought to be the oldest war memorial in the UK. It memorialises on it the names of the Middleton archers who fought at Flodden Field in 1513. The church also has one of the finest collections of monumental brasses in the area, including the only brass in the UK of an English Civil War officer in full armour, Major-General Sir Ralph Assheton.

The church was designated a Grade I listed building in 1957. Middleton Archaeological Society (MAS) have been investigating Clarke Brow, a public field next to St Leonard's Square, and carried out its first dig there in August and September 2013.  An account of the Society's research can be found on their website

Tonge Hall
Tonge Hall is a grade II* listed Tudor structure badly damaged by an arson attack in 2007. Rochdale Council are now (2012) in the process of buying the property from the owner for a nominal sum with a view to restoration. The North West Building Preservation Trust, a registered charity, is likely to take over its long term maintenance.

Middleton Archaeological Society (MAS) has been undertaking research into Tonge and Tonge Hall. The first of these investigations took place in August 2012 and work is ongoing.  The MAS website has more information including photographs of the dig at 

As of 2019, the building still stands derelict, Surrounded by supporting scaffolding. No work has been undertaken on restoration since the arson attack.

Alkrington Hall
Alkrington Hall was built in 1736 and was the seat of the Lever family. Its dominant position on a wooded hillside, looks out over the Irk Valley towards Middleton. The original parkland around the hall has now been developed into high end housing.

Old Boar's Head Inn
Situated below the parish church, on Long Street, this was originally a coaching inn on the road between Chester and York. It is said to date from at least 1632 and parts of it date back to the 1500s.

Sport
Middleton is host to many local sports clubs, including Middleton Cricket Club who are currently playing in the Lancashire League (cricket). Four golf clubs are within easy reach of the town centre: North Manchester Golf Glub, The Manchester Golf Club (at Slattocks), Heaton Park Golf Club and Blackley Golf Club.

In January 2009, Middleton saw the opening of a new £13 million sports and leisure venue in the town centre. The Middleton Arena is a joint venture by Rochdale Metropolitan Borough Council and supermarket chain Tesco. The facility has replaced the old Middleton Civic Centre and Middleton Leisure Centre, allowing the site currently occupied by these buildings to be cleared for further development into a supermarket.

Middleton is also home to Rochdale Triathlon Club.  Weekly coached swimming sessions are currently held at Middleton Arena, Tuesday 7-8pm and Thursday 9-10pm.

Transport
In 2005, the new Middleton Bus Station was opened to replace the old one, next to the Middleton Arndale shopping centre. The station, with 13 stands, cost £4.5 million and replaced the previous station which dated to the 1970s. The majority of services in Middleton are operated by First Greater Manchester and serve destinations including Bury, Oldham, Rochdale and Tameside. Frequent services to Manchester city centre are provided by First Greater Manchester's 17/18 overground services as well as service 163. 
Middleton is located close to junction 19 of the M62 motorway and, at Rhodes, junction 21 of the M60 motorway .

Mills Hill railway station is on the eastern boundary of town, one mile east of the town centre, with direct services to Rochdale, Manchester Victoria, Bolton, Wigan and Leeds. It opened in 1838 and closed in 1842, it was later re-opened in 1985 and remains in use.

Middleton railway station, near the town centre, was the terminus of a short branch line, which closed to passengers in 1964.

A car chase scene of the 2001 British-made Samuel L. Jackson film The 51st State was filmed on a stretch of the M60 motorway, which runs alongside Rhodes and through Alkrington, just outside the centre of the town.

In May 2021 the Mayor of Greater Manchester asked that Transport for Greater Manchester bring forward a business case for extending the Metrolink tram system to Middleton, as part of a wider regeneration scheme.

Education

Almost every part of Middleton is served by a school of some kind, some with religious affiliations. According to the Office for Standards in Education, schools within the town perform at mixed levels.

What is presently the Middleton Campus of Hopwood Hall (a college of further education), was, from 1946 to 1989, a De La Salle Catholic College of Higher Education affiliated to the Victoria University of Manchester. Founded as a teacher training college, the chapel, designed by Sir Frederick Gibberd, was the architectural prototype for the Liverpool Metropolitan Cathedral. The chapel still exists but its spire is no longer topped with a cross. Hopwood Hall College benefits from its extensive grounds and leisure facilities which were developed over many years by the De La Salle College.

Notable people

"Moonraker" is a nickname sometimes given to people from the town (and other places; see Moonrakers). Middleton has been the birthplace and home to notable people, of national and international acclaim. Amongst the most notable persons of historic significance from the town include Thomas Langley (born in Middleton in 1363) who served as Bishop of Durham, Cardinal of the Catholic Church, Lord Chancellor of England, and as England's first de facto Foreign Secretary. Samuel Bamford was a radical writer and politician. He led the Middleton contingent to the meeting at St Peter's Fields in August 1819, pressing for parliamentary reform, which ended in the Peterloo Massacre.

Joel Halliwell (1881 – 1958) was an English recipient of the Victoria Cross in World War I. Lee Rigby, British soldier and victim of the 2013 Woolwich attack, was from Middleton.

Steve Coogan, John Richmond, Clint Boon of Inspiral Carpets, Maartin Allcock of Fairport Convention and Jethro Tull, Brendan and Martin Coogan all attended the local Cardinal Langley Grammar School, later known as Cardinal Langley Roman Catholic High School. Bernard Manning (1930–2007), Manchester-born (Ancoats) comedian, lived in Alkrington. Gold selling music producer Louis Gibzen attended Middleton Technology School; Radio 1Xtra's DJ Semtex is also from the town. All four members of the indie-rock group The Courteeners are also from the area, including frontman Liam Fray. The Chameleons, a post-punk band, was formed in the area, and was described by the Middleton Guardian as "Middleton's most famous export".

Sally Dynevor, an actress in the Manchester-based soap opera Coronation Street is from Middleton.

Notable sportsmen connected with Middleton include Manchester City football player Tommy Booth, Manchester United F.C. (and former England national football team) Paul Scholes (Salford-born) and locally born Mark Allott, the Oldham Athletic midfielder, both educated at St Mary's Roman Catholic Primary School, and later Cardinal Langley Roman Catholic High School. Frank (Typhoon) Tyson, test cricketer from the late 1950s, attended Queen Elizabeth's Grammar school. Norma Ball, wife of Sir Bobby Charlton, attended Queen Elizabeth's grammar school; she married Bobby at St Gabriel's church in Middleton.

Fashion designer John Richmond and Olympic silver medalist Keri-Anne Payne also attended Cardinal Langley Roman Catholic High School.

Pacifist Fred Haslam (1897-1979) was born in Middleton.

British soldier Lee Rigby who was murdered by two terrorists in Central London in 2013 is from here.

See also

Listed buildings in Middleton, Greater Manchester

References

Notes

Bibliography

External links

 www.link4life.org, A brief history of Middleton.
 , Middleton Archaeological Society covering Middleton's heritage.
 www.middletontowncentre.co.uk, a guide to Middleton Town Centre with event and regeneration news.
 www.vmims.com, Historical and genealogical information relating to Middleton.
www.statsandmaps.co.uk Stats and Maps is the Rochdale Borough statistics and maps website. It is a shared evidence based that provides quick and easy on-line access to data, information, and intelligence about the borough of Rochdale, and aims to meet the needs of the local community, LSP partners, and the general public.
 

 
Towns in Greater Manchester
Unparished areas in Greater Manchester
Areas of the Metropolitan Borough of Rochdale